R̃ (lower case: r̃), is a Latin R with a diacritical tilde. In the International Phonetic Alphabet it represents a nasalized version of a trill consonant, or in broader transcription also a nasalized flap or tap.

It is not to be confused with Ȓ (R with inverted breve), R̄ (R with macron) or Ř (R with háček).

Latin letters with diacritics
Letters with tilde